This is a list of the main career statistics of American former tennis player Bill Tilden  (1893–1953) whose amateur and professional career spanned three decades from the early 1910s to the mid 1940s.

Major titles

Performance timeline
Bill Tilden joined professional tennis in 1931 and was unable to compete in the amateur Grand Slam tournaments from that year onward.

Grand Slam tournaments

Pro Slam

ILTF Majors

Career titles

Amateur era
According to Bud Collins, as an amateur (1912–1930) Tilden won 138 of 192 tournaments, lost 28 finals and had a 907–62 match record, a 93.60% winning percentage. Only known titles are detailed here.

Professional era

Davis Cup 
Tilden won 34 out of 41 Davis Cup matches; 25 of his 30 singles matches and 9 out of 11 doubles. He was a member of the victorious United States Davis Cup teams in 1920, 1921, 1922, 1923, 1924, 1925 and 1926.

Professional tours

Records 
 Winning streak of Grand Slam events: 8 titles (1920–1926). Including 6 U.S. titles and 2 Wimbledon titles.
 Winning streak in single matches at Grand Slam events: 51 (1920–1926)
 Second best match winning % in Grand Slam events: 89.76%, with a record of 114–13 (1916–1930). Notice that Björn Borg has a winning percentage of 89.81% with a record of 141–16 (1974–1981) in a span time of about the half of Tilden. This highlights the longevity of Tilden's career.
 Winning streak in single matches at U.S. Championships: 42 (1920–1926)
 Most single titles at U.S. Championships: 7 (1920–1925, 1929)
 Most single finals at U.S. Championships: 10 (1918–1925, 1927, 1929)
 Won single + doubles + mixed doubles titles at same U.S. Championships event (1922, 1923)
 Winning streak in single matches: 98 (1924–1925)
 Best match winning % in one season: 98.73%, with a record of 78–1 (1925)
 Most appearances in final of Davis Cup: 11 with a record of 21–7 in singles (1920–1930)

Career match performance year on year

References 

General sources
 World Tennis Magazines.
 Bud Collins, The Bud Collins History of Tennis, 2008.
 Joe McCauley, The History of Professional Tennis, London 2001.

Tilden, Bill